The Bahamian ambassador in Washington, D. C. is the official representative of the Government in Nassau, Bahamas to the Government of the United States.

List of representatives

References 

 
United States
Bahamas The